Wuhe County is a county in the north of Anhui Province, People's Republic of China, bordering Jiangsu province to the east. Its economy is based on meat production.

Administrative divisions
In the present, Wuhe County has 13 towns, 1 township and 1 ethnic Township.
13 Towns

1 Township
 Lunhu

1 Ethnic Township
 Hui Linbei

Climate

References

External links
 Government website of Wuhe

 
County-level divisions of Anhui